Horse Mountain is a  high mountain in Lake County, California, United States.

Location

Horse Mountain is in the Northern California Coast Ranges.
It is in Mendocino National Forest in Lake County, California.
It drains into the Sacramento River.
The mountain is to the east of the West Fork of Middle Creek, and west of the Rice Fork of Eel River.
It is north of Elk Mountain in the Middle Creek drainage basin northwest of Clear Lake.

Physical

Horse Mountain is forested, but the summit has been cleared.
It is used for recreation by all-terrain vehicles, dirt bikes and hikers.

Notes

Sources

Mountains of Lake County, California